List of side effects of bupropion.

Very common (>10%)
 Headache
 Transient insomnia

Common (1–10%)

 Abdominal pain
 Agitation
 Anxiety
 Asthenia
 Concentration disturbance
 Constipation
 Depression
 Dizziness
 Dry mouth
 Fever
 Nausea
 Pruritus (itchiness)
 Rash
 Sweating
 Taste disorders
 Tremor
 Urticaria (indicative of a hypersensitivity reaction)
 Visual disturbance
 Vomiting

Uncommon (0.1-1%) 

 Anorexia
 Chest pain
 Confusion
 Alopecia
 Flushing
 Increased blood pressure
 Tachycardia (high heart rate)
 Tinnitus

Rare (0.01–0.1%) 

 Abnormal dreams
 Aggression
 Anaphylactic shock
 Angioedema (indicative of a hypersensitivity reaction)
 Arthralgia
 Ataxia
 Blood glucose disturbances
 Bronchospasm (indicative of a hypersensitivity reaction)
 Delusions
 Depersonalization
 Dyspnoea (indicative of a hypersensitivity reaction)
 Dystonia
 Elevated liver enzymes
 Erythema multiforme
 Hallucinations
 Hepatitis
 Hostility
 Hypotension
 Irritability
 Jaundice
 Malaise
 Memory impairment
 Myalgia
 Orthostatic hypotension
 Palpitations
 Paraesthesia
 Paranoid ideation
 Parkinsonism
 Restlessness
 Seizures
 A condition similar to serum sickness
 Stevens Johnson syndrome
 Syncope
 Twitching
 Urinary frequency
 Urinary retention
 Vasodilation

References

Bupropion